Adapt may refer to:
ADAPT, American disability rights organisation
ADAPT – Able Disable All People Together, disability organisation working for Neuro-Muscular and Developmental Disabilities in India since 1972
Adapt (Trace Bundy album), 2004 Trace Bundy album
Adapt (Sakanaction album), 2022 Sakanaction album
Adapt: Why Success Always Starts with Failure, a book by Tim Harford

See also
 Adaptation (disambiguation)